Lostock railway station serves the suburbs of Heaton and Lostock in Bolton, Greater Manchester, England. Built for the Liverpool and Bury Railway in 1852, the station was closed in 1966, then reopened on a smaller scale in 1988 to serve commuters.

According to large scale Ordnance Survey maps and local usage, the surrounding area is named Lostock Junction and the station is referred to as such by many local people. Network Rail's "location map" uses the same name. This is similar to the situation in London where Clapham Junction railway station is in fact in Battersea, and the surrounding area has taken the name of Clapham Junction. Lostock itself is over a mile to the west of the station.

History
Later, a station was constructed at the junction, also named Lostock Junction, which opened around August 1852. The station gave its name to the village which grew around it. This station had platforms on both the Preston and Wigan routes.

On 17 July 1920, four people were killed and 148 were injured in a near head-on collision between two Lancashire & Yorkshire Railway passenger trains at Lostock Junction due to a signal having erroneously been ignored at danger.

Lostock Junction Station closed on 7 November 1966 as part of the programme of cuts initiated by the Beeching Report of 1963. However, on 16 May 1988 the station was reopened, but now with platforms only on the Preston route and renamed Lostock Parkway, a large car park for the use of park-and-ride commuters having been provided. The suffix "Parkway" was later dropped.

Services

It is a popular commuter station.

Saturday and Sunday services were replaced by buses most weekends from May 2015 until November 2018 due to the late-running electrification work on the route. Weekend services resumed on Sunday 11 November 2018 after the completion of the electrification engineering work.

Electric service commenced on Monday 11 February 2019, operated by Class 319 electric multiple units.

All services are operated using  electric units.

Before the December 2022 timetable change, services from Lostock were one train per hour in each direction, with only the Airport services stopping here. The amount of trains was increased from one to two trains per hour after the services were rerouted to both terminate at Manchester Airport.

Station improvements

Most recently in early 2009, the station has had a passenger information display system installed, giving waiting passengers on the platforms information about trains that are due to arrive. Fully computer automated, it is also equipped with an audio speaker system, giving the benefit of announcements of train arrivals and delays. During December 2008 - Spring 2009 the car park facilities were greatly improved by extending and resurfacing the land surrounding the railway, with the addition of floodlighting and CCTV.

Facilities
The station has a ticket office, which is staffed from start of service until 19:35, six days per week (closed Sundays).  A ticket vending machine is in place for purchase of tickets or promise to pay coupons when the ticket office is closed and for the collection of pre-paid tickets. Shelters are located on each platform and both have step-free access (via ramps northbound).

References

External links 

Local information

Railway stations in the Metropolitan Borough of Bolton
DfT Category E stations
Former Lancashire and Yorkshire Railway stations
Railway stations in Great Britain opened in 1852
Railway stations in Great Britain closed in 1966
Railway stations in Great Britain opened in 1988
Reopened railway stations in Great Britain
Northern franchise railway stations
1920 disasters in the United Kingdom
1852 establishments in England
Beeching closures in England